Bethel Albert Herbert Solomons (27 February 1885 – 11 September 1965), born into a prominent Jewish family, was an Irish medical doctor and an international rugby player for Ireland and supporter of the 1916 Rising.

Early life
Bethel Albert Herbert Solomons born in Dublin, Ireland, to a prominent Jewish family, one of the oldest continuous Jewish families in Ireland. The Solomons came over to Ireland from England in 1824. Bethel Solomons was the son of Maurice Solomons (1832–1922), an optician whose practice is mentioned in James Joyce's Ulysses. His grandmother Rosa Jacobs Solomons (1833–1926) was born in Hull in England.

Bethel's elder brother Edwin (1879–1964) was a stockbroker and prominent member of the Dublin Jewish community. His sister Estella Solomons (1882–1968) was a leading artist, and a member of Cumann na mBan during the 1916 rising; she married poet and publisher Seamus O'Sullivan. His younger sister Sophie was a trained opera singer.

Career
Solomons attended St. Andrews School in Dublin where he was very interested in rugby; He earned 10 international rugby caps for Ireland (1908–1910).

He studied medicine in Trinity College, Dublin, became a medical doctor, and was Master of the Rotunda Hospital in Dublin from 1926 to 1933. This is mentioned in Finnegans Wake in my bethel of Solyman's I accouched my rotundaties.
He served as president of the Royal College of Physicians of Ireland (RCPI) in the late 1940s and he practiced from No. 30 Lr. Baggot Street.

In a biography of Solomons he was described as "World famous obstetrician & gynaecologist, Rugby international, horseman, leader of Liberal Jewry & of Irish literary & artistic renaissance."

Personal life
He married Gertrude Levy in the liberal synagogue in London in 1916. His second son, Dr Michael Solomons (1919–2007) was a distinguished gynaecologist, a pioneer of family planning in Ireland, and a veteran of the bitter and divisive 1983 constitutional amendment campaign.

He was a friend of the founder of Sinn Féin and TD, Arthur Griffith. Solomons contributed to the purchase of a house for Griffith. Solomons was a founding member and the first president of the Liberal Synagogue in Dublin.

Solomon was an art collector, including the works of Jean Cooke.

See also
List of select Jewish rugby union players

Notes

References
 Encyclopedia Judaica, Second Edition, volume 19, p146
 Goodwin, Terry The Complete Who's Who of International Rugby (Blandford Press, England, 1987)

1885 births
1965 deaths
Rugby union players from Dublin (city)
Alumni of Trinity College Dublin
Irish Jews
Irish obstetricians
Irish rugby union players
Ireland international rugby union players
Jewish rugby union players
Dublin University Football Club players
Wanderers F.C. (rugby union) players
Rugby union forwards
Irish people of English-Jewish descent
Irish hospital administrators
Presidents of the Royal College of Physicians of Ireland